North East Delhi Lok Sabha constituency is one of the 7 Lok Sabha (parliamentary) constituencies in National Capital Territory of Delhi. This constituency came into existence in 2008 as a part of the implementation of the recommendations of the Delimitation Commission of India constituted in 2002. This LS constituency is dominated by migrants from UP and Bihar.

Assembly segments
At present, North East Delhi Lok Sabha constituency comprises the following 10 Vidhan Sabha (legislative assembly) segments:

Members of Parliament
The North-East Delhi Lok Sabha constituency was created in 2009. The list of Member of Parliament (MP) is as follows:

Election results

17th Lok Sabha: 2019 General Elections

16th Lok Sabha: 2014 General Elections

15th Lok Sabha: 2009 General Elections

See also
 Delhi Sadar (Lok Sabha constituency)
 List of former constituencies of the Lok Sabha

References

Lok Sabha constituencies in Delhi
2008 establishments in Delhi
Constituencies established in 2008